Gaspard Augé (born 21 May 1979 in Besançon) is a French musician and graphic designer. He is one of the two members of French electronic music duo Justice.

Biography 
Augé was born into a family of Protestant industrialists from Besançon, France. He is the nephew of André Marcel Augé, whose father André Augé founded Augé Découpage, a metallurgy company now owned by Diehl Metall.

He created his first musical project with his cousin Théo Vuarnet called Microloisir (Back in your Eyes), recorded in his home with a computer microphone and an Ableton sequencer. He later became a retro-futurist graphic designer, under the pseudonym, Gaspirator, and designed shirts for Sixpack France, one of which was worn by M. Pokora in the music video for his single Dangerous.

In 2010, he designed the covers for Surkin's Silver Island, Fan Out Remixes and Ultra Light EPs. Gaspard was also chosen to compose the music for the film Rubber with Mr. Oizo. He also makes an appearance in the film in the role of a hitchhiker.

As part of Justice, Augé received a Grammy Award in 2019 alongside de Rosnay for their remix album Woman Worldwide, under the category for Best Dance/Electronic Album. 

Between 2020 and 2021, Augé co-produced Kavinsky's second album, Reborn. Also in 2021, he announced the release of his first solo studio album, Escapades, which he released on 25 June 2021.

Discography

Albums

References

French electronic musicians
French DJs
1979 births
Living people